Dearborn is a surname. Notable people with the surname include:

 Arthur Dearborn (1886–1941), American track and field athlete
 Emma Dearborn (1875–1937), creator of the Speedwriting System
 Henry Dearborn (1751–1829), American physician, general, and politician
 Henry Alexander Scammell Dearborn (1783–1851), American lawyer, author, statesman, soldier and son of Henry Dearborn
 Jason Dearborn, Canadian businessman and former politician (Saskatchewan Party MLA)
 Justin Dearborn (born c. 1971), American businessman
 Phyllis Dearborn, founding partner of Dearborn-Massar
 Walter Dearborn (1878–1955), American psychologist, educator, pioneer in the psychology of reading

See also 
 Dearborn (disambiguation)
 Dearborne (surname)

English-language surnames